is a 2012 Japanese drama film directed by Kōji Wakamatsu. The film was based on the Mishima Incident, which was a failed coup d'etat attempt led by Yukio Mishima in 1970. The film competed in the Un Certain Regard section at the 2012 Cannes Film Festival.

Plot 
In 1970, a well-known Japanese public figure and famous writer, Yukio Mishima, while visiting a military base, suddenly began calling for soldiers to revolt. When his proposal was rejected, he committed suicide in the way that the ancient samurai resorted to if they believed that they were indelibly ashamed. The film will try to put all the fragments of the mosaic in place and find out why this is the end of the life of this outstanding personality.

Cast
This is the film cast.
 Arata Iura as Yukio Mishima (the head of Tatenokai)
 Shinnosuke Mitsushima as Masakatsu Morita (the second student leader of Tatenokai)
  as Hiroyasu Koga (Tatenokai member)
  as Otoya Yamaguchi (the boy who killed Inejiro Asanuma)
  as Kiyoshi Kuramochi (a Tatenokai member)
  as Kenichi Tanaka (a Tatenokai member)
 Tomosuke Kasamatsu as Kazuhiko Nakatsuji (a Tatenokai member)
 Yuki Hirano as Tomoaki Turuoka (a Tatenokai member)
  as Makatsu Sekikawa (a Tatenokai member and  player)
  as Hidetoshi Saito (a Nihon Gakusei Domei member)
  as Shigeru Ueda (Morita's childhood friend)
 Hanae Kan as Makiko (a Tatenokai member, Shigeru's sister)
  as Ikarii, Lieutenant general (the principal of the Fuji school of Japan Self-Defense Forces)
 Gô Jibiki as Takashi Fukuoka (an instructor of the Fuji school)
  as Kiyokatsu Yamamoto (the manager of information education section of Investigation school of JSDF)

References

Bibliography

External links
 

2012 films
2012 drama films
Japanese drama films
2010s Japanese-language films
Films directed by Kōji Wakamatsu
Yukio Mishima
2010s Japanese films